John Edward Halsell (September 11, 1826 – December 26, 1899) was a U.S. Representative from Kentucky.

Born near Bowling Green, Kentucky, Halsell attended the common schools at Rich Pond, Kentucky, and Cumberland University, Lebanon, Tennessee.
He studied law.
He was admitted to the bar in 1856 and commenced practice in Bowling Green.
He served as prosecuting attorney of Warren County for four years.

Halsell was elected circuit judge of the fourth judicial district of Kentucky in 1870.

Halsell was elected as a Democrat to the Forty-eighth and Forty-ninth Congresses (March 4, 1883 – March 3, 1887).
He served as chairman of the Committee on Private Land Claims (Forty-ninth Congress).
He was an unsuccessful candidate for renomination.
He resumed the practice of law.
He served as mayor of Bowling Green from December 5, 1888, to December 5, 1889.
He moved to Fort Worth, Texas, and continued the practice of law.
He died in Fort Worth, December 26, 1899.
He was interred in Fair View Cemetery, Bowling Green, Kentucky.

References

1826 births
1899 deaths
Democratic Party members of the United States House of Representatives from Kentucky
Kentucky state court judges
19th-century American politicians
19th-century American judges